Shirin Kand may refer to:
 Shirin Kand, Malekan
 Shirin Kand, Maragheh